Sou Hrostao Akoma Ena Klama (Greek: Σου Χρωστάω Ακόμα Ένα Κλάμα; English: I owe you one more cry) is the title of the twelfth studio album by the popular Greek artist Peggy Zina, released on 4 October 2012 by Minos EMI in Greece and Cyprus.

Track listing

Charts

References

2012 albums
Greek-language albums
Peggy Zina albums
Minos EMI albums